KSMA-FM is a radio station airing a country music format licensed to Osage, Iowa, broadcasting on 98.7 MHz FM.  The station serves the areas of Mason City, Iowa, and Austin, Minnesota, and is owned by North Iowa Broadcasting.

The station is located in historic Downtown Mason City.  They also play a Classic Country format weekdays called 'Lunch With The Legends', showcasing artists like Johnny Cash, Patsy Cline, Waylon Jennings, and many more.  The station broadcasts Osage High School basketball and football games during the regular seasons.

History
The station was owned by Clear Channel being branded as "98.7 Kiss FM" playing a Top 40 format (which started on August 13, 2001) before it was bought by Coloff Media, LLC, who then changed the format to Country as "98.7 Kiss Country" on October 2, 2007.

Staff and On-Air Schedule
J. Brooks and the Morning Rush  - weekdays 5AM-10AM /
Rob Getz - weekdays 10AM-2PM /
Chris Berg

Weekend programming includes syndicated shows Powered By Country, The Road, Thunder Road, and American Country Countdown with Kix Brooks.

References

External links
KSMA-FM's official website

Country radio stations in the United States
SMA-FM